Sant Jaume, Catalan for Saint James, may refer to:

Sant Jaume d'Enveja, municipality in the comarca of Montsià
Sant Jaume de Frontanyà,  municipality in the comarca of Berguedà
Sant Jaume de Llierca, village in the province of Girona
Sant Jaume dels Domenys, village in the province of Tarragona